SpotHero is a digital parking marketplace that connects drivers looking to reserve and pay for parking spaces with parking lots, parking garages and valet services. The company, which operates a mobile app and website as well as a parking developer platform, is available in over 300 cities in the United States and Canada. The company is based in Chicago, Illinois.

History

Early beginnings
SpotHero was founded by Mark Lawrence and Jeremy Smith in Chicago in 2011, with co-founder Larry Kiss joining the company soon after. The company started out as a peer-to-peer parking marketplace, where people could rent out their own private parking spots, before expanding the platform to partner with parking companies and garages.

In December 2012, SpotHero raised $2.5 million in venture capital funds from Battery Ventures (lead), 500 Startups, Bullet Time, e.Ventures, OCA Ventures, New World Ventures, Lightbank, and Draper Associates; at the time, it only served Milwaukee and Chicago. In June 2014, SpotHero raised an additional $4.5 million in funding and announced new board of directors members, including LinkedIn's Mike Gamson, Match.com's Sam Yagan, and venture capitalist Sam Guren. The company raised $20 million in Series B funding in 2015, and an additional $30 million in a Series C round in July 2017. In September 2018, the company raised an additional $10 million, bringing its total raised since launching to $68 million. In August 2019 SpotHero announced $50 million in Series D funding led by Macquarie Capital, bringing the company's total funding to date to $118 million.

Growth and expansion
Between 2011 and 2013, the company expanded from 5 employees to 22, grew to seven business markets (Chicago, New York, Washington, D.C., Boston, Baltimore, Newark, and Milwaukee) and opened an office in New York City. By August 2015, SpotHero serviced 5 additional cities: Denver, Minneapolis, New Orleans, Philadelphia, and San Francisco. In July 2016, the company expanded to Los Angeles, and in January 2017 added 13 additional cities, including Austin, Indianapolis, Miami and San Diego. In 2020, the company was recognized as the fifteenth-largest privately held consumer marketplace. As of November 2020, the company services over 300 cities in North America with a network of over 7,000 garages.

SpotHero for Business was launched in March 2017, as a business-focused service with features and tools for paying, managing and organizing parking expenses. The company also launched a free developer platform to help businesses integrate parking reservations into their existing apps. In May 2017, SpotHero announced a partnership with commuter employee benefits administrator WageWorks allowing users to pay pre-tax dollars for daily parking near their places of work.

In 2018, SpotHero was named to Time magazine's inaugural list of 50 Genius Companies that are inventing the future. According to Time, "By allowing users to reserve a spot rather than circling dense city centers, apps like SpotHero can help stem congestion and pollution." That year, SpotHero purchased 500 Waze beacons for $15,000 and gave them to the Chicago Department of Transportation to install in the lower roads of downtown Chicago, broadcasting an open signal so GPS will work properly. Following an integration of its technology with Google Assistant and Hertz rental cars, SpotHero announced that it had readied 500 parking facilities in Chicago for driverless cars.

In March 2019, SpotHero partnered with transit app Moovit to offer drivers the chance to view and book off-street parking near transit stations in San Francisco, to help ease road congestion in the Bay Area. In June 2019, it was reported that SpotHero was partnering with Waze, a GPS navigation software app owned by Google, to link their navigation and parking into a unified user experience.

In early 2020, the company launched SpotHero IQ, a dynamic pricing product allowing operators of parking garages or lots to adjust prices based on real-time data.

Acquisitions
In April 2015, SpotHero acquired San Francisco-based peer-to-peer parking marketplace ParkPlease.

In April 2017, SpotHero acquired Parking Panda, a Baltimore-based services and event parking company. The acquisition expanded SpotHero into Canada, and brought the number of parking locations the company could reserve at to over 5,000.

In November 2020, SpotHero acquired the Toronto-based app Rover Parking, helping the company access thousands more parking locations across Canada.

See also
 ParkWhiz
 Parking Panda

References

External links
 Official website

Online companies of the United States
Companies based in Chicago
Privately held companies of the United States
Parking companies
Transport companies established in 2011
Internet properties established in 2011
2011 establishments in Illinois
IOS software
Android (operating system) software
American companies established in 2011